Friedrich Wilhelm Karl Ernst Schröder (25 November 1841 in Mannheim, Baden, Germany – 16 June 1902 in Karlsruhe, Germany) was a German mathematician mainly known for his work on algebraic logic. He is a major figure in the history of mathematical logic, by virtue of summarizing and extending the work of George Boole, Augustus De Morgan, Hugh MacColl, and especially Charles Peirce. He is best known for his monumental Vorlesungen über die Algebra der Logik (Lectures on the Algebra of Logic, 1890–1905), in three volumes, which prepared the way for the emergence of mathematical logic as a separate discipline in the twentieth century by systematizing the various systems of formal logic of the day.

Life
Schröder learned mathematics at Heidelberg, Königsberg, and Zürich, under Otto Hesse, Gustav Kirchhoff, and Franz Neumann. After teaching school for a few years, he moved to the Technische Hochschule Darmstadt in 1874. Two years later, he took up a chair in mathematics at the Karlsruhe Polytechnische Schule, where he spent the remainder of his life. He never married.

Work 
Schröder's early work on formal algebra and logic was written in ignorance of the British logicians George Boole and Augustus De Morgan. Instead, his sources were texts by Ohm, Hankel, Hermann Grassmann, and Robert Grassmann (Peckhaus 1997: 233–296). In 1873, Schröder learned of Boole's and De Morgan's work on logic. To their work he subsequently added several important concepts due to Charles Sanders Peirce, including subsumption and quantification.

Schröder also made original contributions to algebra, set theory, lattice theory, ordered sets and ordinal numbers. Along with Georg Cantor, he codiscovered the Cantor–Bernstein–Schröder theorem, although  Schröder's proof (1898) is flawed. Felix Bernstein (1878–1956) subsequently corrected the proof as part of his Ph.D. dissertation.

Schröder (1877) was a concise exposition of Boole's ideas on algebra and logic, which did much to introduce Boole's work to continental readers. The influence of the Grassmanns, especially Robert's little-known Formenlehre, is clear. Unlike Boole, Schröder fully appreciated duality. John Venn and Christine Ladd-Franklin both warmly cited this short book of Schröder's, and Charles Sanders Peirce used it as a text while teaching at Johns Hopkins University.

Schröder's masterwork, his Vorlesungen über die Algebra der Logik, was published in three volumes between 1890 and 1905, at the author's expense. Vol. 2 is in two parts, the second published posthumously, edited by Eugen Müller. The Vorlesungen was a comprehensive and scholarly survey of algebraic logic up to the end of the 19th century, one that had a considerable influence on the emergence of mathematical logic in the 20th century. He developed Boole's algebra into a calculus of relations, based on composition of relations as a multiplication. The Schröder rules relate alternative interpretations of a product of relations.

The Vorlesungen is a prolix affair, only a small part of which has been translated into English. That part, along with an extended discussion of the entire Vorlesungen, is in Brady (2000). Also see Grattan-Guinness (2000: 159–76).

Schröder said his aim was:

Influence

Schröder's influence on the early development of the predicate calculus, mainly by popularising C. S. Peirce's work on quantification, is at least as great as that of Frege or Peano. For an example of  the influence of Schröder's work on English-speaking logicians of the early 20th century, see Clarence Irving Lewis (1918). The relational concepts that pervade Principia Mathematica are very much owed to the Vorlesungen, cited in Principias Preface and in Bertrand Russell's Principles of Mathematics.

Frege (1960) dismissed Schröder's work, and admiration  for Frege's pioneering role has dominated subsequent historical discussion. Contrasting Frege with Schröder and C. S. Peirce, however, Hilary Putnam (1982) writes:

 Works 
 Schröder, E., 1877. Der Operationskreis des Logikkalküls. Leipzig: B.G. Teubner.
 Schröder, E., 1890–1905. Vorlesungen über die Algebra der Logik, 3 vols. Leipzig: B.G. Teubner. Reprints: 1966, Chelsea; 2000, Thoemmes Press. 
Vorlesungen über die Algebra der Logik (Exakte Logik), Volume 1,
Vorlesungen über die Algebra der Logik (Exakte Logik), Volume 2, Abt. 1
Vorlesungen über die Algebra der Logik (Exakte Logik), Volume 2, Abt. 2
Algebra und Logik der Relative, der Vorlesungen über die Algebra der Logik 3, Volume 3, Abt. 1
 Schröder, E., 1898. "Über zwei Definitionen der Endlichkeit und G. Cantor'sche Sätze", Abh. Kaiserl. Leop.-Car. Akad. Naturf 71: 301–362.

Anthologies
 Brady, Geraldine, 2000. From Peirce to Skolem. North Holland. Includes an English translation of parts of the Vorlesungen.

See also
 Schröder's equation
 Schröder number
 Schröder–Bernstein property
 Schröder–Bernstein theorem for measurable spaces
 Schröder–Hipparchus number

References

Further reading
 Irving Anellis, 1990–91, "Schröder Materials at the Russell Archives," Modern Logic 1: 237–247.
 Dipert, R. R., 1990/91. "The life and work of Ernst Schröder," Modern Logic 1: 117–139.
 Frege, G., 1960, "A critical elucidation of some points in E. Schröder's Vorlesungen über die Algebra der Logik", translated by Geach, in Geach & Black, Translations from the philosophical writings of Gottlob Frege. Blackwell: 86–106. Original: 1895, Archiv für systematische Philosophie 1''': 433–456.
Ivor Grattan-Guinness, 2000. The Search for Mathematical Roots 1870–1940. Princeton University Press.
Clarence Irving Lewis, 1960 (1918).  A Survey of Symbolic Logic. Dover.
 Peckhaus, V., 1997. Logik, Mathesis universalis und allgemeine Wissenschaft. Leibniz und die Wiederentdeckung der formalen Logik im 19. Jahrhundert. Akademie-Verlag.
 Peckhaus, V., 1999, "19th Century Logic between Philosophy and Mathematics," Bulletin of Symbolic Logic 5: 433–450. Reprinted in Glen van Brummelen and Michael Kinyon, eds., 2005. Mathematics and the Historian's Craft. The Kenneth O. May Lectures. Springer: 203–220. Online here or   here.
 Peckhaus, V., 2004. "Schröder's Logic" in Gabbay, Dov M., and John Woods, eds., Handbook of the History of Logic. Vol. 3: The Rise of Modern Logic: From Leibniz to Frege. North Holland: 557–609.
 Hilary Putnam, 1982, "Peirce the Logician," Historia Mathematica 9: 290–301. Reprinted in his 1990 Realism with a Human Face. Harvard University Press: 252–260. Online fragment.
 Thiel, C., 1981. "A portrait, or, how to tell Frege from Schröder," History and Philosophy of Logic 2'': 21–23.

External links 
 
 http://web.archive.bibalex.org/web/20041010033618/http://intranet.woodvillehs.sa.edu.au/pages/resources/maths/History/Schrdr.htm (requires login, unprovided)
 
 

1841 births
1902 deaths
19th-century German mathematicians
German logicians
Scientists from Mannheim
People from the Grand Duchy of Baden
Academic staff of Technische Universität Darmstadt